The Story of Post-Modernism: Five Decades of the Ironic, Iconic and Critical in Architecture, published in 2011, was the last book by Charles Jencks. Jencks discusses the history of Post-modernism, especially in the fields of art and architecture during the last five decades (since 1960).  Jencks argues that since the beginning of the millennium, post-modernism has experienced a deep rebirth which should be studied.

The Story of Post-Modernism has divided its narration into seven parts which are both in order of time and lap-jointed. It illustrate the way post-modern movement has gone up and down passing through different train of thoughts. Using many pictures and diagrams, Jencks in each chapter focuses on the main works of a given period and offers a deep analysis of them.  

Jencks in the book explains on why he is using the term Post-Modernism and not postmodernism as this:

See Also  
 Postmodernism
 Architectural theory
 Postmodern architecture
 Charles Jencks
 Theories and Manifestoes of Contemporary Architecture

References 

2011 non-fiction books
Art history books
Architecture books
English non-fiction books
Wiley (publisher) books